Roger Hayward (1899 – October 11, 1979) was an American artist, architect, optical designer and astronomer. He is the inventor of an early Schmidt-Cassegrain camera that was patented in 1945. He was born on January 7, 1899, to mother, artist Ina Kittredge (Phelps) Hayward and local businessman and time piece hobbyist Robert Peter Hayward.  He was the grandson of American landscape artist William Preston Phelps.

In December 1968 he wrote "Blivets: Research and Development" to The Worm Runner's Digest in which he presented interpretations of impossible objects.

References

US Patent 2,403,660, Schmidt-Cassegrain camera

External links
 The Roger Hayward Papers
Roger Hayward - Renaissance Man, a biography of Roger Hayward written by his family members and published by Oregon State University
 A digitized collection of pastel drawings of molecules created by Hayward

20th-century American engineers
1899 births
1979 deaths